Huhentomon is a genus of proturans in the family Hesperentomidae found in China and Japan. There is one species in this genus, Huhentomon plicatunguis.

Species
 Huhentomon plicatunguis Yin, 1977
 Huhentomon plicatunguis haradai Imadaté, 1989  
 Huhentomon plicatunguis plicatunguis Yin, 1977

References

Protura